Oksana Ravilova (born 20 May 1967) is a Russian speed skater. She competed at the 1992, 1994 and the 1998 Winter Olympics.

References

External links
 

1967 births
Living people
People from the Sakha Republic
Russian female speed skaters
Olympic speed skaters of Russia
Olympic speed skaters of the Unified Team
Speed skaters at the 1992 Winter Olympics
Speed skaters at the 1994 Winter Olympics
Speed skaters at the 1998 Winter Olympics
Sportspeople from Sakha